Ray Atkeson (February 13, 1907 – May 25, 1990) was a U.S. photographer best known for his landscape images, particularly of the American West.
His best known photographs are black and white prints, many still popular in galleries, stores, books, traveling art exhibitions, and screensavers.  His awards include:
 Distinguished Citizen of Oregon
 Honorary Doctorate of Fine Arts from Linfield College
 Distinguished Service Award
 Oregon Governor's Art Award
 Oregon state Photographer Laureate (1987–1990)
 inducted into the Photographic Hall of Fame

History 
Ray Atkeson was a commercial photographer in Portland, Oregon for seventeen years 1929-1946 after arriving in Oregon in 1927.  From 1946-1973 he was a free lancer photographer and published several photo compilations.  The photobooks are mostly of Oregon and Washington, but later work included California.

His photographs captured 1930s fishing vessels recently adapted to use engines to women building warships for World War II.
Alan Engen called Atkeson "the finest ski photographer ever."

Atkeson lugged around heavy 4x5 camera equipment and photographed a rich variety of winter mountain scenery and activity.  Many of his alpine photos were taken before the chairlift was invented and required ski stamina.
Among his subjects were Errol Flynn, Yosemite, many of the Oregon and Washington Cascade mountains. In his later years his granddaughter Karen Schmeer assisted him with his work, including driving him to photo-shoot locations after his eyesight began to fail.

Atkeson maintained two homes: one on the Oregon Coast, the other in Portland.

In 1988, Atkeson was one of the chief petitioners for the successful Measure 7 which added  to the Oregon Scenic Waterway System originally formed by an initiative passed in 1970.

Books

Legacy 
The Ray Atkeson Photography Collection was donated to the University of Oregon in 2018.  It contains over 250,000 negatives which are available to researchers.

References 

Photographers from Oregon
1907 births
1990 deaths
Artists from Portland, Oregon